Tenball was a cue sports tournament that was staged only once in 1995. it was a snooker/pool hybrid played on the same table and with the same balls as snooker, its rules and gameplay being a mix of those of snooker and of pool. An ITV/LWT TV series Tenball was created that formed a tournament, featuring the game hosted by Phillip Schofield. The show ran for one series, throughout 1995, in an eight-man tournament, won by Jimmy White.

Rules
The game and the ITV/LWT TV series Tenball focused on a tournament that was created in 1995 by a team consisting of managers Russ Lindsay and Peter Powell, snooker player Steve Davis who devised the rules and entrepreneur Barry Hearn who was asked to do the promotion for the event to add razzmatazz to the show. The series was hosted by Phillip Schofield and its set was designed by Andy Walmsley. The sole season, in 1995, saw Jimmy White win the tournament, while Peter Ebdon achieved the highest break of 122  (out of a possible 200).

Games competed over for ITV's Tenball series featured best of five frame matches. However, unlike in regular snooker, the first potted colour in a break associated the score for every colour potted in that break thereafter, rather than the score of the colour that the ball that was potted. The series also promoted  similar to pool if a foul was played, or could receive ten points for each foul shot. Three consecutive fouls from a player would cause them to retire from the frame.

Prize money

Results

References

Snooker variants
1990s British game shows
British sports television series
Snooker on television
1995 British television series debuts
1995 British television series endings
ITV game shows
Television series by ITV Studios
London Weekend Television shows
English-language television shows
Defunct snooker competitions